In baseball, players rarely wear spectacles, but some players played in the major leagues with glasses. For many years, wearing glasses while playing the sport was an embarrassment. Baseball talent scouts routinely rejected spectacled prospects on sight. The stigma had diminished by the early 1960s and by one estimate 20 percent of major league players wore glasses by the end of the 1970s. The development of shatter-resistant lenses in the latter half of the 1940s contributed to their acceptance.

The first major-league player to wear spectacles was Will 'Whoop-La' White in 1878–86. Only pitchers dared wear glasses while playing until the early 1920s, when George 'Specs' Toporcer of the St. Louis Cardinals became the first outfielder to sport eyewear. Bespectacled pitchers are less rare as they have less need to field the ball.

There are only three players in the Baseball Hall of Fame to have worn eyeglasses during play: Chick Hafey, Reggie Jackson, and Greg Maddux. Because his vision became so variable, Hafey was obliged to rotate among three different pairs of glasses.

List

Non-pitchers
Other notable non-pitchers who wore glasses include:
 Dick Allen — first American League MVP to wear glasses
 Jay Bell
 Alex Cole
 Bob Coluccio
 Clint Courtney — first catcher to wear glasses
 Al Cowens
 Bob Dillinger
 Dom DiMaggio — "The Little Professor"
 Brian Downing
 Leon Durham
 Alvaro Espinoza
 Tim Foli
 Dan Ford
 Freddie Freeman
 Randal Grichuk
 Johnny Grubb
 Jerry Hairston
 Bryce Harper - Typically wears contact lenses, but wore prescription eyeglasses in 2018.
 Frank Howard
 Danny Jansen
 Reggie Jackson
 Eddie Joost Shortstop, career spanned 3 decades, both NL and AL
 Ron Kittle
 Carney Lansford
 Vance Law
 Stan Lopata — the first National League catcher to wear glasses
 John Lowenstein
 Greg Luzinski
 Roy McMillan
 Mario Mendoza
 Kendrys Morales
 Rance Mulliniks
 Joe Nolan
 Mitchell Page
 Dan Pasqua
 Ken Phelps 
 Jason Phillips
 Darrell Porter
 Dave Ricketts
 Cookie Rojas
 Chris Sabo
 Lenn Sakata
 Eric Sogard
 Andrew Stevenson
 Andre Thornton
 Kelby Tomlinson
 Earl Torgeson — Replied "Because I want to be able to see." when asked by Jack Brickhouse why he wore glasses when he played.
 Bill Virdon
 Bob Watson
 Glenn Wilson
 Steve Yeager

Pitchers
Pitchers who wore glasses include:
 Henderson Álvarez
 Anthony Banda
 Ronald Belisario
 Corbin Burnes (originally, before having lasik)
 Brett Cecil
 Gustavo Chacin
 Tyler Clippard
 Bill Dietrich
 Randy Dobnak
 Sean Doolittle
 Ryne Duren — once hit a batter in the on-deck circle
 Kyle Farnsworth
 Josh Fleming
 Éric Gagné
 Scott Garrelts
 Kevin Gregg
 A. J. Griffin
 JD Hammer
 Mel Harder
 Tom Henke
 Jimmy Herget
 Carmen Hill
 Dick Hughes
 Tom Hume
 Anthony Kay
 Joe Kelly
 Jim Konstanty
 'Deacon Danny' MacFayden
 Denny McLain
 Craig McMurtry
 Lee Meadows
 Pete Mikkelsen
 Greg Minton
 Eric Plunk
 Cody Reed
 Nate Robertson
 Francisco Rodríguez
 Dave Sisler
 Nick Snyder
 Vic Sorrell of the Detroit Tigers
 Paul Splittorff
 Kent Tekulve
 Trent Thornton
 Julio Urías
 José Valverde
 Bob Veale
 Fernando Valenzuela
 Vance Worley

And an umpire:
 Frank Umont — first major league umpire to wear glasses

References

Baseball-related lists
Baseball players